Egira rubrica is a species of cutworm or dart moth in the family Noctuidae. It is found in North America.

The MONA or Hodges number for Egira rubrica is 10514.

Subspecies
These two subspecies belong to the species Egira rubrica:
 Egira rubrica rubrica
 Egira rubrica rubricoides Barnes & Benjamin, 1924

References

Further reading

 
 
 

Orthosiini
Articles created by Qbugbot
Moths described in 1878